Madelaine Rachel Phillips (born September 6, 1994) is a Canadian actress who portrayed Randeen in Ghost Wars, Devon D'Marco in Project Mc2, and Sterling Wesley in the 2020 Netflix teen comedy-drama television series Teenage Bounty Hunters.

Personal life
Maddie Phillips was born in Vancouver, British Columbia. She decided on an acting career at the age of six, where she also started going by the nickname Maddie. Phillips' family moved to Perth, Australia, at the age of 10. She attended Penrhos College, Perth.

Career 
Phillips' debut appearance on screen was in the 2013 film If I Had Wings. In 2014, she was lead actress in the short film Antoinette.  In 2016, Phillips starred as Sugar in the short film Victory Square. 

In 2015, she starred in an episode of Supernatural. Phillips' first recurring role came as Devon D'Marco in the Netflix television series Project Mc2 in 2017; the same year, she played Girl Alex in two episodes of season 1 of the television series Hit the Road and starred as Cassandra in the Mockumentary short film The Roommate, which was featured at the International Canadian Comedy Film Festival. 

In 2018, Phillips landed a recurring role as Randeen in five episodes of Ghost Wars.  She made appearances as Kit in 2 episodes of the Syfy fantasy horror drama television series Van Helsing in 2018. The same year, she starred in another episode of Supernatural, and appeared as a supermerket elf in the Christmas TV movie Santa's Boots.

Phillips was cast in a main role as Sterling Wesley in the 2020 Netflix teen comedy-drama television series Teenage Bounty Hunters, alongside Anjelica Bette Fellini, who plays her twin sister. In 2022 she will be appearing as a young superhero in an Untitled Spinoff of The Boys (comics)

Filmography

Film

Television

Music Videos

References

External links 
Maddie Phillips Instagram

Noble Son - Sleepin' music video

Living people
Actresses from Vancouver
Canadian film actresses
Canadian television actresses
21st-century Canadian actresses
1994 births